Well wagon may refer to
 intermodal container well wagon including ones that carry semi-trailers
 Kangourou wagon
 Pocket wagon
 Pre containerization well wagons (pocket wagons)
 Special low deck wagons

See also 
 Lowmac
 Tiphook
 Well car